The Lenya banded bent-toed gecko (Cyrtodactylus lenya)  is a species of gecko that is endemic to Myanmar.

References 

Cyrtodactylus
Reptiles described in 2017